Lake Hayward may refer to:

 Lake Hayward (Connecticut)
 Lake Hayward (Wisconsin)
 Hayward Lake in British Columbia